The following is an overview of 2017 in Chinese music. Music in the Chinese language (Mandarin and Cantonese) and artists from Chinese-speaking countries (Mainland China, Hong Kong, Taiwan, Malaysia, and Singapore) will be included.

Events
ABU TV Song Festival 2017 (November 1)

Charts
List of Billboard China V Chart number-one albums of 2017
List of Billboard China V Chart number-one videos of 2017
List of Billboard China V Chart top 10 albums of 2017
List of Global Chinese Pop Chart number-one songs of 2017

TV shows
Sing! China (season 2) (July 14 – October 8)
Singer (season 5) (January 21 – April 22)

Awards

2017 Chinese Music Awards
2017 ERC Chinese Top Ten Awards (zh)
2017 CMIC Music Awards
2017 Global Chinese Golden Chart Awards
2017 Global Chinese Music Awards
2017 Midi Music Awards
2017 Migu Music Awards
2017 MTV Europe Music Awards Best Greater China Act: Henry Huo
2017 Music Radio China Top Chart Awards
2017 Top Chinese Music Awards
The 5th V Chart Awards

Debuting

Groups
7Senses
CKG48 
SHY48 
YHBOYS

Releases

Third quarter

September

Fourth quarter

October

November

December

See also 

2017 in China

References

 
2017 in music